Asus Zenfone 5 is a line of Android smartphones made by Asus. It is part of the Asus Zenfone series. The ZenFone 5 was unveiled on 27 February 2018 at the Mobile World Congress and went on sale on 6 August 2018, while the higher-end ZenFone 5Z was unveiled on 16 May 2018 and went on retail sale on 6 August 2018. The smartphone line also includes the lower-end ZenFone 5 Lite.

Variants

References 

Android (operating system) devices
Mobile phones introduced in 2018
Mobile phones with multiple rear cameras
Mobile phones with 4K video recording
Discontinued flagship smartphones
Asus ZenFone